Diego Durán (c. 1537 – 1588) was a Dominican friar best known for his authorship of one of the earliest Western books on the history and culture of the Aztecs, The History of the Indies of New Spain, a book that was much criticised in his lifetime for helping the "heathen" maintain their culture.

Also known as the Durán Codex, The History of the Indies of New Spain was completed in about 1581.  Durán also wrote Book of the Gods and Rites (1574–1576), and Ancient Calendar (c. 1579). He was fluent in Nahuatl, the Aztec language, and was therefore able to consult natives and Aztec codices as well as work done by earlier friars. His empathetic nature allowed him to gain the confidence of many native people who would not share their stories with Europeans, and was able to document many previously unknown folktales and legends that make his work unique.

Early life
Durán was born sometime around 1537 in Seville, Spain.  His family traveled to Mexico when he was about seven years old. Later he wrote "although I did not acquire my milk teeth in Texcoco, I got my second ones there." 

Durán grew up in Tetzcoco (Texcoco), in the present state of México, an important learning center where there had been an extensive pre-Hispanic library of books in pictorial form, now called “codices.” The inhabitants of Tetzcoco spoke Nahuatl, the language of the Aztec, and the boy soon spoke it as well as his native Spanish. This served him well in his later work among the natives as a friar and as an ethnographer, interviewing Nahuatl-speaking people in rural areas.

When he was still young, his family moved to Mexico City where he attended school and was exposed to Aztec culture under the colonial rule of Spain, as well as the many Africans brought by the Spanish as slaves.  According to Heyden, Durán was often puzzled by the mix of races and cultures and their significance for social class.

Life within the Church
In 1556 he entered the Dominican Order and was sent to Oaxaca in 1561 after being trained in Mexico City. He resided for a time at a convent, or friary, in Oaxtepec, and there he found many informants within the Church.  He is believed to have been tutored by Dominican Fray Francisco de Aguilar, who had once been a soldier involved in the siege of Tenochtitlan.  Aguilar later joined the Dominican order, and had much to tell Durán about the Aztecs at first contact.  He was cited frequently by Durán in his History.

Durán later became a vicar at a convent in Hueyapan and it was there that he learned the most from the native Nahuas. The convents had been issued a decree by Charles V to preach the Christian word to native rural villages and Durán ventured into the villages frequently to converse with the natives there.  The clergy were to also observe native customs and to search for ancient documents. particularly the lost Holy Scriptures of Saint Thomas (who was believed to have been the basis for the Aztecs' Quetzalcoatl).

He developed a close association with the people he was attempting to convert, which led him to criticize the clerics and conquistadors who never learned the natives’ language, writing "they should know the language well and understand [the people] if they have any pretense of obtaining fruit. And the clergy should not acquiesce by saying they need know only enough of the tongue in order to hear confession and that is enough." (Book of the Gods and Rites) and scorns the Spaniards' crude use of the language that made the natives scoff.

Durán was torn between two worlds, his own people, and the Aztecs. On one hand, he respected the Aztecs and their governmental organization before the conquest; and he grew to admire the native people of Mexico, and often said so. On the other hand, he was repulsed by certain acts of his native informants, particularly human sacrifice. It was, after all, his duty to evangelize them and his Catholic background gave him a great disdain for such things. Another of his duties was to document the cultural ways and practices of the native people to serve as a manual for other monks in their attempt to evangelize them. Although his purpose was to detail the "heathen practices" as a manual for other missionaries, he also wanted to make it pleasant to read and useful to others.

In 1585 Friar Diego returned to Mexico City in ill health to live and work in the Convent of St. Dominic there, as a translator from Nahuatl to Spanish for the Inquisition. He died in 1588 of an unknown illness.

Historical works and influence
The History of the Indies of New Spain, sometimes referred to as the Durán Codex, contains 78 chapters spanning from the Aztec creation story until after the Spanish conquest of the Aztec Empire, and includes a chronology of Aztec emperors.

The friars of the 16th century borrowed one another's material without citation.  Some scholars believe that the Durán Codex formed the basis for the Ramirez Codex although others believe that both Ramirez Codex and the Durán Codex relied on an earlier unknown work referred to as "Chronicle X".  In 1596, Durán was cited as a source by Fray Agustín Dávila Padilla in his Historia de la fundación y discurso de la Provincia de Mexico.

The Durán Codex was unpublished until the 19th century, when it was found in the Library of Madrid by José Fernando Ramírez.  In his Ancient Calendar, Durán explains why his work would go so long without being published by saying "some persons (and they are not a few) say that my work will revive ancient customs and rites among the Indians", to which he replied that the Indians were quite good at secretly preserving their own customs and cultures and needed no outside help.

Durán's work has become invaluable to archaeologists and others studying Mesoamerica and scholars studying Mesoamerican ethnohistory. Although there are few surviving Aztec codices written before the Spanish invasion, the more numerous post-conquest codices and near-contemporary works such as Durán's and Sahagún's are invaluable sources for the interpretation of archaeological theories and evidence, but more importantly for constructing a history of the natives from texts produced by the natives themselves, as exemplified in the New Philology.

See also
Aztec
Crónica Mexicayotl
Nahuatl
Dominican Order
List of people from Morelos, Mexico

References

Further reading
Durán, Diego. La Historia de las Indias de Nueva España e Islas de Tierra Firme. edited by Angel María Garibay. Mexico City, 1967.

Durán, Diego. Book of the Gods and Rites and the Ancient Calendar. Translated and edited by Fernando Horcasitas and Doris Heyden. Foreword by Miguel León-Portilla. 2nd ed. Norman, Okla., 1977.
Fray Diego Durán's The History of the Indies of New Spain, translated, annotated and with introduction by Doris Heyden. Norman:  University of Oklahoma Press, 1994.

External links
an article analyzing the Aztec Eight Commandments as documented by Durán
High-resolution scans of   The History of the Indies of New Spain in the original Spanish

Aztec scholars
Historians of Mesoamerica
Novohispanic Mesoamericanists
16th-century Spanish historians
1530s births
1588 deaths
People of New Spain
People from Morelos
Spanish Dominicans
Spanish Roman Catholic missionaries
16th-century Mesoamericanists
16th-century male writers
Roman Catholic missionaries in New Spain
Dominican missionaries